Franklin Underwood, also known as Frank Underwood during the 1960s, is an American songwriter and jazz pianist. Underwood lives in Manhattan. His show Lovely Ladies, Kind Gentlemen, a musical based on The Teahouse of the August Moon with Stan Freeman opened on Broadway in 1970. His credits include songs for Rod Warren's 1964 Chicago revue The Game Is Up, and "I Wish I'd Met You" sung by Lena Horne and Sammy Davis, Jr. with music by Johnny Mandel and lyrics by Richard Rodney Bennett and Frank Underwood. Other songs include "Real Men Don't Eat Quiche".

References

External links

Living people
American male songwriters
American jazz pianists
American male pianists
American musical theatre composers
American musical theatre lyricists
Year of birth missing (living people)
Place of birth missing (living people)
21st-century American pianists
21st-century American male musicians
American male jazz musicians